The Ramong Sound was a British R&B, soul and ska band, active from 1965 to 1966.

History
The Ramong Sound was a London based outfit, that featured two black lead singers doing Sam & Dave styled duets, one of them being former professional boxer Clem Curtis, and the other being Raymond Morrison aka Ramong Morrison. Curtis joined the group after hearing from his uncle that the lead singer of the group Ramong, was looking for backing singers and he should give it a try. At this time was Curtis's singing experience was more or less limited to singing with his uncle when he came around the house with the guitar. Prior to joining the Ramong Sound, 25 yo Curtis was a professional boxer and had worked as a painter and interior decorator. Guitar player Alan Warner was an experienced musician, and joined the Ramong Sound after having worked in various bands. He would stay with the group through all of their name change evolutions from Ramongs to Foundations, until he left the Foundations in 1970 to join progressive rock band Pluto. At some stage the group had dropped the "sound" part of their name and shortened it to simply The Ramongs, or The Ramong.

The group had a steadily growing reputation and following around the London club scene due to the energetic performance of the group. After the original lead singer, Ramong Morrison, whom the group was named after, was imprisoned for six months, a friend of the band called Joan suggested Arthur Brown as a replacement. While with the group, Brown and Curtis would do songs separately as well as together in Duets. They were covering mainly soul music material. Years later in an interview Brown stated that he was "chuffed" to be singing with Curtis. Incidentally Brown already had his Crazy World band up and running at the same time. Around this time they had gone through a succession of name changes that included The Foundation Sound, The Foundation Squad and would eventually evolve into The Foundations. Arthur Brown would leave the band after a few weeks, and they would emerge in January 1967 with a new horn section replacing Mike Felano and the other horn player. This new horn section consisted of Dominican trombonist Eric Allandale and Jamaican saxophonists Pat Burke and Mike Elliott. Tim Harris replaced Lyndsay Arnold as the drummer and Clem Curtis was now the lead singer. The Foundations would go on to have several hits, including "Baby Now That I've Found You" and "Build Me Up Buttercup".

Later years 
In 1969, Curtis was in the US and was involved with Cowsills Productions, which was connected to the group The Cowsills. He had signed to Liberty Records with a single "Marie Take A Chance" in the pipeline. He recorded a succession of singles for various labels throughout the 70s and into the 2000s with the last being Lord Large Feat. Clem Curtis, "Stuck in a Wind Up" / "Move Over Daddy".

Raymond Morrison would record a single "Girl I Want To Hold You" backed with "Money Can't Buy Life", released on the Sugar label in 1970. Later in a duo with Tam (Tamara), he recorded a succession of singles in the late 1970s for the Hawk and Hyfan labels. Ran & Tam also released an album Love & Life in 1986.

Raymond Morrison died at age 81 in Jamaica in February 2013.

Clem Curtis died aged 76 in March 2017.

Former personnel
 Raymond Morrison aka Ramong Morrison – lead vocals
 Clem Curtis – lead vocals
 Arthur Brown – vocals
 Alan Warner – vocals
 Peter McBeth – bass guitar
 Con – keyboards
 Lyndsay Arnold – drums
 Mike Felano – trumpet
 Unknown – other horns

References

External links
 Alex Gitlin Pluto page http://www.alexgitlin.com/npp/pluto.htm
 Clem Curtis site https://web.archive.org/web/20080925091517/http://www.clemcurtis.com/biography.htm
 Alan Warner site  http://www.alan-warner.com

English ska musical groups
British rhythm and blues musical groups
The Foundations